Creative Biolabs, Inc. is a life-science company which produces and supplies biotech products and services for early drug discovery and development, including various phage display libraries such as pre-made libraries, phage display services, antibody sequencing, and antibody humanization. Customers include pharmaceutical companies, academic institutions, government agencies, clinical research organizations and biotechnology companies.

History
Creative Biolabs Inc. was founded in 2005 by a group of scientists researching on the treatment and prevention of intractable diseases like cancer. The company has distributors in Australia, New Zealand, Japan and other countries in Europe, Asia, and America. Its headquarter is in Shirley, New York. In June 2017, Creative Biolabs set up its first scholarship program.

Services 
Fab construction is a complex technique as Fab fragments contain both variable domains and constant regions. The same heavy and light variable chains used for scFv construction can be used in the construction of Fab.

Construction of pre-made phage display libraries. Pre-made phage display library is a laboratory technique for the study of protein–protein, protein–peptide, and protein–DNA interactions that uses bacteriophages (viruses that infect bacteria) to connect proteins with the genetic information that encodes them.

Sequencing services such as Database Assisted Shotgun Sequencing (DASS) technology

Analysis of microarray hybridization data

Yeast two-hybrid screen

Products 
Monoclonal antibodies such as mouse anti-human Duox2 monoclonal antibody S-40

Immunoglobulin Y (IgY) such as Anti-ADP3 chicken IgY

Antibody libraries such as HuSdLTM phage display human single domain antibody library

Response to COVID-19 
Creative Biolabs offers SARS-CoV-2 S antibodies that come from common hosts like human, mouse, and rabbit, and apply to various lab tests, like ELISA, FC, ICC/IF, etc. Apart from S protein antibodies, Creative Biolabs also provides a comprehensive list of anti-SARS-CoV-2 antibodies to assist with the research and development of drug and vaccine candidates, including but not limited to antibodies targeting genes like N, S1/S2, and ORF7a.

Creative Biolabs Scholarship Program 
Since the first scholarship program in 2017, Creative Biolabs has released scholarship every year. The scholarship award of $1,000 is given to one student of freshman, undergraduate, graduate or Ph.D. level majoring in science-related fields such as Biology, Biochemistry, Chemistry and Molecular Biology.

References

Companies based in Suffolk County, New York
Biotechnology companies of the United States
Biotechnology companies established in 2005
2005 establishments in New York (state)